Évelyne Wilwerth (born 1947) is a Belgian author writing in French.

She was born in Spa and earned her certificate to teach Romance philology. She taught French for nine years before retiring to devote herself to writing. She has lived in Stavelot, Virton, Nivelles, Paris, Provence and most recently in Brussels. Wilwerth has led writing workshops in Belgium and France. She has also participated in conferences on French literature.

Her stories have been broadcast on RTBF and on Radio Canada.

Wilwerth has translated several poetry collections by Willem Roggeman from Dutch into French. She has also published youth literature and several essays on writing by women.

Selected works

Poetry 
 La péniche-ferveur (1978)
 Le cerfeuil émeraude (1981)
 Neiges de boule (1989)
 Dessine-moi les quatre éléments (1993) with Manu van de Velde
 22 astuces pour une vie plus magique (2011)

Novels 
 Canal océan (1997)
 La vie cappuccino (1999)
 Je m'appelle Rhubarbe (2004)
 Papillon mortel (2010)
 Miteux et magnifiques (2013)

Stories 
 Grenat (1982) with Manu van de Velde
 Histoires très fausses (1985)
 Embrasser la vie sur la bouche (2001)

Plays 
 Hortense, ta pétillance (1980)
 Pulchérie et Poulchérie (1982)
 Gil et Giroflée (1983)
 Pieds nus dans la lumière (2004)

References 

1947 births
Living people
Belgian poets in French
Belgian translators
Belgian women novelists
Belgian women short story writers
Belgian short story writers
20th-century Belgian dramatists and playwrights
21st-century Belgian dramatists and playwrights
Belgian women dramatists and playwrights
Belgian women poets
20th-century Belgian novelists
20th-century Belgian poets
21st-century Belgian novelists
21st-century Belgian poets
20th-century short story writers
21st-century short story writers
20th-century Belgian women writers
21st-century Belgian women writers